The 2021 Booker Prize for Fiction was announced on 3 November 2021, during a ceremony at the BBC Radio Theatre. The longlist was announced on 27 July 2021. The shortlist was announced on 14 September 2021. The Prize was awarded to Damon Galgut for his novel, The Promise, receiving £50,000. He is the third South African to win the prize, after J. M. Coetzee and Nadine Gordimer.

Judging panel
Rowan Williams
Horatia Harrod
Natascha McElhone
Chigozie Obioma
Maya Jasanoff (Chair)

Nominees

Shortlist

Longlist

See also
List of winners and shortlisted authors of the Booker Prize for Fiction

References

Man Booker
Booker Prizes by year
2021 awards in the United Kingdom